Charlcote House, also known as the James Swan Frick House, is a historic home located at Baltimore, Maryland, United States. It is a three-story brick detached Classical Revival dwelling built about 1914–1916 in the Guilford development.  It is one of the two identified domestic buildings in Maryland designed by John Russell Pope (the other is Woodend at Chevy Chase).

Charlcote House was listed on the National Register of Historic Places in 1988.

References

External links
, including photo from 1996, at Maryland Historical Trust
 Smith, H. D. "Recent Domestic Architecture from the Designs of John Russell Pope."  The Brickbuilder, Vol. XXV, Issue 8, August 1916. pp. 189-204 and following plates.

Guilford, Baltimore
Houses in Baltimore
Houses on the National Register of Historic Places in Baltimore
Houses completed in 1916
John Russell Pope buildings
Neoclassical architecture in Maryland